Aksel Hennie (born 29 October 1975) is a Norwegian actor, director, and screenwriter. He is best known for his roles in the films Headhunters (2011), Hercules (2014), and The Martian (2015).

Early life
Hennie was born in the Lambertseter suburb of Oslo on 29 October 1975. In his late teens, he was arrested for graffitiing, and became an outcast in the graffiti community after confessing to the police. His "writes" or signatures were "Ceel" and "Mikro" and can still be seen around Oslo. Most of them are crossed out or lined over because of his confession. This personal story contributed much of the background for the film Uno. The conviction against Hennie was one of the first such cases in Norway.

Career
Hennie was admitted to the Norwegian National Academy of Theatre after applying four times. He graduated in 2001, and has acted both at Teatret Vårt in Molde (2001–2002) and at Oslo Nye Teater (since 2002), where he has been in plays such as Hamlet and Kvinnen Som Gifftet Seg Med en Kalkun (The Woman Who Married a Turkey).

Hennie's most notable success has been as a film actor. He made his debut starring in the feature film Jonny Vang in 2003. Although the director, Jens Lien, originally thought Hennie was too young for the role, the actor convinced him he was the right man for the film. That same year, he also acted in the films Buddy and Ulvesommer. The next year, Hennie made his debut as a director and writer with the film, Uno, in which he also acted. For this role, Hennie and his co-star, Nicolai Cleve Broch, undertook six months of hard physical training in order to perform convincingly as bodybuilders.

In 2001, Hennie was named "Theatre Talent of the Year" by the newspaper Dagbladet.  Hennie won the Amanda Award (an important Norwegian film award), for "Best Direction" for Uno in 2005. That year he was among the nominees for "Best Actor" and "Best Film." He won an Amanda Award for "Best Actor" for Jonny Vang in 2003. He was named one of European film's "Shooting Stars" by the European Film Promotion in 2004. 

In 2008, Hennie starred in Max Manus, where he played the Norwegian war hero of the same name. The film had a large budget by Norwegian standards. In 2011, Age of Heroes was released, a World War II film primarily shot in Norway. On 30 August 2013, Pionér, a docudrama, was released.  Hennie plays the main role as a commercial offshore diver in the North Sea during the 1970s who witnesses an accident while diving under extreme conditions, prompting him to search for answers. 

On 1 December 2013, Hennie won an Angela Award at the Subtitle European Film Festival in Kilkenny for his role in the film 90 Minutes. That evening he appeared at a showing of Headhunters, and did a question and answer session with the audience in the theatre after the film.

Filmography

Awards and nominations

References

External links 
 

1975 births
Living people
Norwegian male film actors
Norwegian male stage actors
Norwegian male voice actors
Oslo National Academy of the Arts alumni
Male actors from Oslo
Writers from Oslo
Norwegian film directors
21st-century Norwegian male actors
20th-century Norwegian male actors